Serena Lo Bue (born 4 August 1995) is an Italian lightweight rower. She competes with her sister Giorgia in the lightweight pair event, and at the 2018 World Rowing Championships in Plovdiv, Bulgaria, they became world champions.

References

1995 births
Living people
Italian female rowers
World Rowing Championships medalists for Italy